The Pratt & Whitney XT57 (company designation: PT5) was an axial-flow turboprop engine developed by Pratt & Whitney in the mid-1950s. The XT57 was developed from the Pratt & Whitney J57 turbojet.

Design and development

One XT57 (PT5), a turboprop development of the J57, was installed in the nose of a JC-124C (BuNo 52-1069), and tested in 1956.

The engine had a split-compressor (also known as "two-spool") design.

In the late 1950s, the XT57 was studied for use in a United States Navy-proposed, nuclear-powered conversion of a Saunders-Roe Princess flying boat. Despite not having entered service, the engine was selected because it had passed a Pratt & Whitney 150-hour testing program, which involved running the engine for 5,000–7,000 hours.

Variants

T57/PT5 A turboprop engine driving a  Hamilton Standard Turbo-Hydromatic propeller,  turboprop to be used on the Douglas C-132, a Mach 0.8 speed military transport aircraft.

Engines on display
The XT57 engine is on display at the Pratt & Whitney museum in East Hartford, Connecticut.

Applications
T57 turboprop
 Douglas JC-124C Globemaster II testbed
 Douglas C-132 (not built)

Specifications (XT57-P-1)

See also

References

Notes

Bibliography

External links
 
 
 

1950s turboprop engines
XT57